Dennis Ewart Simpson (1 November 1919 – 10 January 2002) was an English footballer who played on the right-wing for Coventry City, Reading, Exeter City in the Football League.

Career
Simpson signed with Coventry City in May 1939 after being spotted playing for Saleem Baptist. He guested for Port Vale during the war, in 1946. After continuing his career at Highfield Road, he scored five goals in 67 Second Division games, as Coventry finished eighth in 1946–47, tenth in 1947–48, 16th in 1948–49, and 12th in 1949–50. Simpson was allowed to leave the club by manager Harry Storer, and moved on to Reading in May 1950. He helped the "Royals" to third in the Third Division South in 1950–51, before they moved up to second place in 1951–52 – just five points behind champions Plymouth Argyle. Reading then dropped down the league after outgoing manager Ted Drake was replaced by Jack Smith, finishing 11th in 1952–53, eighth in 1953–54, and 18th in 1954–55. Simpsons scored 31 goals in 172 league goals during his time at Elm Park. He joined Third Division South club Exeter City in Ma1y 1955, remaining as a part-time professional as he worked as an engineer in Exmouth. He helped Norman Dodgin's "Grecians" to finish 16th in 1955–56 and 21st in 1956–57. He scored four goals in 30 league games during his brief spell at St James Park, but left the club in February 1957 after refusing to train on a full-time basis. He later ended his career at non-League Exmouth Town.

Career statistics
Source:

References

Footballers from Coventry
English footballers
Association football wingers
Coventry City F.C. players
Port Vale F.C. wartime guest players
Reading F.C. players
Exeter City F.C. players
Exmouth Town F.C. players
English Football League players
English engineers
1919 births
2002 deaths